For emergency medical services, Metropolitan Medical Strike Teams (MMSTs) are federally established teams prepared to respond (if needed) to assist with medical management and public health consequences of chemical, biological and radiological incidents which result from accidental or deliberate acts.

The MMST is designed to supplement the local Haz-Mat and medical response to WMD (Weapons of Mass Destruction), by offering specialized equipment and knowledge, as well as additional Fire/EMS personnel, tactical and traditional law enforcement, physicians and nurses. These multi-jurisdictional, multi-disciplinary teams are trained to manage mass-casualty incidents.

The Atlanta-Fulton county MMST is an example of one such team. It is currently based around mutual aid between agencies on the local and state level.

References

Emergency services in the United States